Obaid Al Shamrani (born 24 July 1985) is a Saudi Arabian footballer who plays as a defender.

Career
He formerly played for Al-Ittihad, Al-Raed, Al-Nahda, and Al-Diriyah.

References

External links
 

1985 births
Living people
Saudi Arabian footballers
Association football defenders
Ittihad FC players
Al-Raed FC players
Al-Nahda Club (Saudi Arabia) players
Al-Diriyah Club players
Saudi Professional League players
Saudi Second Division players